Velaine is a French language placename and may refer to the following:

Belgium
 Velaine-sur-Sambre, a locality in the municipality of Sambreville, province of Namur

France
 Velaine-en-Haye, a commune in the department of Meurthe-et-Moselle
 Velaine-sous-Amance, a commune in the department of Meurthe-et-Moselle

See also
 Velaines